"Your Song" is a 1970 song by Elton John, covered by a number of artists, including Ellie Goulding in 2010.

Your Song may also refer to:

TV
 Your Song, a Cypriot reality talent show broadcast in Mega Channel Cyprus
 Your Song (TV series), a 2006-11 Filipino musical anthology series

Music
 Your Songs, a 2009 album by Harry Connick, Jr.
 Your Song (EP), a 2007 EP by Guy Sebastian
 "Your Song" (Rita Ora song), a 2017 song by Rita Ora
 "Your Song" a 2013 song by Japanese artist Yun Chi
 "Your Song", a song by Kate Walsh
 "Your Song", a song by Koda Kumi, a B-side of the single "Take Back"
 "Your Song (One and Only You)", a song by Filipino rock band Parokya ni Edgar
 "Your Song ~Seishun Sensei~", a 2004 song by Aya Matsuura
 "Tu canción", also recorded in English as "Your Song", a 2018 song by Amaia Romero and Alfred García